Robert Suettinger was President Bill Clinton's national intelligence officer for East Asia at the National Intelligence Council (NIC) from 1997 to 1998. While there, Suettinger oversaw the preparation of national intelligence estimates for the director of the Central Intelligence Agency. His areas of specialty included the People's Republic of China and the North Korean nuclear weapons program.  After working in the Clinton administration, Suettinger has been a senior analyst for the Brookings Institution where he wrote the book Beyond Tiananmen – The Politics of U.S.-China Relations, 1989-2000. He also is a senior advisor at The Stimson Center.

Suettinger previously served as Director for Asian Affairs on the National Security Council from March 1994 to October 1997, where he assisted National Security Advisers Anthony Lake and Sandy Berger in the development and implementation of U.S. policy toward the Asia-Pacific region.

He also served as deputy national intelligence officer for East Asia at the NIC from 1989 to 1994, and from 1987 to 1989 was President George H. W. Bush's director of the office of analysis for East Asia and the Pacific at the Department of State, Bureau of Intelligence and Research.

Suettinger earned his undergraduate degree at Lawrence University and holds a master's degree in comparative politics from Columbia University.

References

Year of birth missing (living people)
Living people
American intelligence analysts
Columbia University alumni
Lawrence University alumni
The Stimson Center
United States Department of State officials